Glycocholic acid, or cholylglycine, is a crystalline bile acid involved in the emulsification of fats. It occurs as a sodium salt in the bile of mammals. It is a conjugate of cholic acid with glycine. Its anion is called glycocholate.

See also
 Taurocholic acid

References

Bile acids
Cholanes